Crosby–Nash Live is a 1977 live album released by Crosby & Nash. It was remastered and re-released in 2000 with one previously unreleased recording ("Bittersweet"), and one previously unreleased recording and song ("King of the Mountain").

Track listing

Personnel 
 David Crosby – vocals, rhythm guitars
 Graham Nash – vocals, pianos, rhythm guitars
 David Lindley – slide guitar, violin
 Danny Kortchmar – lead guitars
 Tim Drummond – bass
 Craig Doerge – pianos, synthesizers, melodica
 Russ Kunkel – drums

Production 
 Produced by David Crosby, Graham Nash, Don Gooch and Stephen Barncard
 Remote Engineers – Ray Thompson and Don Gooch
 Remote Facilities – Wally Heider Recording in LA, Record Plant White Truck in NY
 Assistant Engineer NY – David Hewitt
 Remix Engineers – Stephen Barncard and Don Gooch
 Reissue Produced by Stephen Barncard and Mike Ragogna
 Tracks 04 and 09 remixed by Stephen Barncard, 11/3/99-11/4/99
 Assisted by Sander De Jong
 Art Direction and Design – Gary Burden
 Back Photography – Henry Diltz
 Cover and Band Photography – Joel Bernstein
 Inside Photography – Marianna Diamos

Recording dates 

 Track 1 & 3 -  Garden State Art Center, Homdel, NJ on 28 August 1976
 Track 2 recorded at Syria Mosque, Pittsburgh, PA on 24 August 1976 and the Shaffer Music Festival, Central Park, NY on 11 September 1976;
 Track 4 recorded at the Shaffer Music Festival, Central Park, NY on 10 September 1976
 Tracks 5 & 6 recorded at Blossom Music Festival, Akron (Cuyahoga Falls), OH on 26 August 1976
 Tracks 7 & 10 recorded at Zellerbach Auditorium, Berkeley, CA on 21 November 1975
 Track 8 recorded at Anaheim Convention Center, Anaheim, CA on 23 May 1976
 Track 9 recorded at Beacon Theatre, New York, NY on 7 September 1975
 Track 11 recorded at the Shaffer Music Festival, Central Park, NY on 8 & 11 September 1976

Charts

Releases

 CD	Live Universal Special Products / MCA	 2000
 Digi	Live Universal Special Products / MCA	 2006
 CD	Live Atlantic	
 LP	Live Universal Special Products

References

External links
 Crosby & Nash Official Website

Crosby & Nash live albums
1977 live albums
ABC Records live albums
Albums produced by David Crosby
Albums produced by Graham Nash
Albums produced by Stephen Barncard